Dipankar Roy (born 7 November 1982) is a retired Indian professional footballer who played as a midfielder. He played most of his professional career for East Bengal in the National Football League and I-League.

Career
Born in Kolkata West Bengal, Dipankar Roy began his professional career playing with the Tata Football Academy before joining JCT in 1998-99 season. After a set of impressive performances, Dipankar was signed by Kolkata giants East Bengal in 1999, where he would go on to play for the next 10 seasons winning three National Football League titles along with several other honours for the club. He joined Mohammedan Sporting in 2009. He had spells with Calcutta Premier Division side Southern Samity before rejoining East Bengal again in 2013 before finally hanging-up his boots and retire from professional football.

East Bengal
In 1999, Dipankar Roy joined East Bengal club and went on to play for the next 10 seasons. During his stay with the club, Dipankar Roy has won a total of 22 trophies which includes three National Football League titles, the famous ASEAN Club Championship title, three IFA Shield titles, two Durand Cup titles, one Federation Cup, seven Calcutta Premier Division titles and few others.

Dipankar Roy scored four goals in the National League in his maiden season and he played a pivotal role during the club's maiden NFL title win in 2000-01, scoring three goals as a midfielder. He was once again back in form during the 2003-04 National league, scoring three goals again from the midfield as East Bengal won their third NFL title.

In 2003-04 season, Dipankar Roy scored four goals in a match as East Bengal recorded their highest ever margin of victory in the tournament against Wari FC in the IFA Shield.

In 2013, Dipankar Roy rejoined the club to finally retire from professional football wearing the Red and Gold kit.

Personal life
Dipankar Roy's personal life has been controversial as he was arrested in 2004 for allegedly sheltering an absconder along with co-player Sashti Duley. He was later granted bail.

Career statistics

Honours

Club
East Bengal
ASEAN Club Championship (1): 2003
National Football League (3): 2000-01, 2002-03, 2003-04
Federation Cup (1): 2007
Super Cup (1): 2006
IFA Shield (3): 2000, 2001, 2002
Durand Cup (2): 2002, 2004
Calcutta Premier Division (7): 1999, 2000, 2002, 2003, 2004, 2006, 2013
San Miguel International Trophy (1): 2004
McDowell Cup (1): 2000
All Airlines Gold Cup (1): 2001
Independence Cup (1): 2003

References

External links
 

1982 births
Living people
Indian footballers
East Bengal Club players
Association football defenders
Footballers from Kolkata
I-League players